Gomal is an administrative unit, known as Union council, of Tank District in the Khyber Pakhtunkhwa province of Pakistan. Union Council sarangzuna, parts of dabara union council namely Garwaki, Kot Hakim, Jatta Qila and union council Gomal  combined form Gomal valley, commonly referred to as Gomal Ilaqa or Gomal Valley. Gomal valley share its borders with South Waziristan Agency in the west, FR Tank in the north, FR D.I.Khan In the south, D.I.Khan in the south east and Tank in the north East. There are two rivers that run through Gomal Valley namely Gomal river (Southern side of valley) and Narsis River (Northern side of the valley). Khand Wand, a small river, separates from Gomal River at Baikarah (sarangzuna) and falls into narsis river a couple of kilometers to the north of Jatta Qila (Union Council Dabbara).  Gomal Valley comprises several village, including Garwaki, Gomal Bazar, Kot Nawaz, Kot Murtaza, Kot Azam, Kot Khadak and Kot Hakim. Villages of Raghza and Kot Manjhi reside on the southern side of Gomal river   while Narsis (a hilly area) reside on the northern side of Narsis River. The rest of the villages lie in the green land between the two rivers. Gomal Valley is known for its green and fertile fields. Wheat, Sugar cane, Rice are grown abundantly. Grapes, oranges, apple, and pomegranate are also grown. Gomal valley has a high density of trees.

There are several tribes that reside in Gomal Valley namely Taib Khel, Bhittani, Miani, Garwaki (Descendants of Prophet Muhammad through Sheikh Mohammad Rohani) also referred to as Garwaki Sayyids. All of these have lived in the valley for centuries. Over the years, a large population of Mehsud tribes have settled in the valley along with Burki Tribes from South Waziristan. Their Number has been increased due to recent war on terror and military operations in South Waziristan Agency.

District Tank has 1 Tehsils i.e. Tank. Each tehsil comprises certain numbers of union councils. There are 16 union councils in district Tank.

See also 

 Tank District

External links
Khyber-Pakhtunkhwa Government website section on Lower Dir
United Nations
Hajjinfo.org Uploads
PBS paiman.jsi.com 

Tank District
Populated places in Tank District
Union councils of Khyber Pakhtunkhwa
Union Councils of Tank District